Abikoviromycin is an antiviral antibiotic piperidine alkaloid with the molecular formula C10H11ON which is produced by the bacteria Streptomyces abikoensis and Streptomyces rubescens.

References

Further reading 

 

antibiotics
Heterocyclic compounds with 3 rings
Tetrahydropyridines
Epoxides